The Woman in the House Across the Street from the Girl in the Window (originally titled The Woman in the House) is an American dark comedy streaming television miniseries created by Rachel Ramras, Hugh Davidson, and Larry Dorf for Netflix. Actors Kristen Bell, Michael Ealy, Tom Riley, Mary Holland, Cameron Britton, Shelley Hennig, and Samsara Yett star in the series, which has elements of thrillers, but is primarily a parody of mystery psychological thrillers, as well as Scream. The eight-episode series runs less than four hours and was released on January 28, 2022, on Netflix. It received mixed reviews from critics, while Bell's performance was praised.

Between January 23, 2022, to February 20, 2022, the show was watched for 133.62 million hours on Netflix globally.

Premise
A heartbroken woman named Anna (Kristen Bell) is unsure of whether or not she witnessed a murder. She mixes alcohol with medications prescribed by her therapist, has frequent hallucinations, and suffers from a crippling fear of the rain (ombrophobia). Anna is ostracized by members of her community, including her new neighbors, and labeled "crazy" by the police. Regardless of whether or not she saw a murder take place, Anna takes it upon herself to find the truth.

Cast and characters

Main

 Kristen Bell as Anna Whitaker, a painter who takes a break from her career to mourn the death of her eight-year-old daughter, a tragedy that also broke up her marriage. She suffers from a fear of rain and frequently drinks whole bottles of wine with her various medications, resulting in vivid hallucinations. She cooks chicken casseroles and reads books with titles like The Woman Across the Lake and The Girl on the Cruise.
 Michael Ealy as Douglas Whitaker, Anna's ex-husband, a forensic psychiatrist and FBI profiler specializing in serial killers
 Tom Riley as Neil Coleman, Anna's widowed neighbor
 Mary Holland as Sloane, Anna's supportive friend, a local art gallery owner
 Cameron Britton as Buell, a friendly, simple-minded handyman who has been repairing Anna's mailbox for years.
 Shelley Hennig as Lisa, Neil's girlfriend whom Anna believes has been murdered. It is later revealed her real name is Chastity Linkous.
 Samsara Yett as Emma Coleman, Neil's nine-year-old daughter

Recurring
 Brenda Koo as Carol, Anna's judgmental neighbor 
 Christina Anthony as Detective Becky Lane
 Benjamin Levy Aguilar as Rex, a stripper

Additional cast include: Appy Pratt as Elizabeth, Anna's 8-year-old daughter who died in 2018, Brendan Jennings as Massacre Mike, a cannibalistic serial killer who murdered Elizabeth, Janina Gavankar as Meredith, Neil's wife who died a few months before he moved in across from Anna, Nitya Vidyasagar as Hillary, Meredith's sister, Nicole Pulliam as Claire, Douglas's coworker, and Lyndon Smith as Ms. Patrick, the murdered teacher. The final episode features cameo appearances by Jim Rash as a flight attendant and Glenn Close as a businesswoman on the flight.

Episodes

Production

Development
On October 20, 2020, Netflix gave the production a limited series order consisting of eight episodes. The miniseries is created by Rachel Ramras, Hugh Davidson, and Larry Dorf and executive produced by Kristen Bell (who also stars), Will Ferrell, Jessica Elbaum, and Brittney Segal. Gloria Sanchez Productions is involved with producing the miniseries. The creators had to cancel different ideas in their drafts for getting a comfortable shoot during the COVID-19 pandemic, and Ferrell was supervising them online through Zoom conversations.

Casting
On February 19, 2021, Tom Riley joined the main cast. On March 2, 2021, Mary Holland, Shelley Hennig, Christina Anthony, Samsara Yett, Cameron Britton, and Benjamin Levy Aguilar were cast in starring roles. On November 10, 2021, it was reported Michael Ealy was cast to star as a lead. Glenn Close revealed that she joined the cast on one request only, while the character's background was not decided yet.

Filming
Principal photography took place in Los Angeles between March and May 2021.

While filming, hibiscus tea was used in place of red wine. Bell and Ealy had a five-minute dance sequence which was cut from the release. Bell and Yett filmed much of their fight scene themselves, but they did rely on stunt doubles for certain scenes. The rain sequences required Bell to act in  temperature. While Bell said she has no idea about a sequel after the cliffhanger, the creators however, hinted that they are discussing for a possible sequel when they were asked about the casting of Close.

The series draws inspiration from A. J. Finn's The Woman in the Window, Paula Hawkins's The Girl on the Train, Daphne du Maurier's Rebecca, Alfred Hitchcock's Rear Window, and Gillian Flynn's Sharp Objects. Bell's detective role in the series is also inspired by her previous character Veronica Mars, and she also covered the rhyme "Rain Rain Go Away" for the opening theme.

Release
On December 8, 2021, the series was given a premiere date of January 28, 2022, and a new title: The Woman in the House Across the Street from the Girl in the Window. Bell revealed that she defended the title when Netflix wanted to shorten it. After it released, it topped on Netflix in the US, between January 30 and February 3.

Reception
 Metacritic, which uses a weighted average, assigned a score of 49 out of 100 based on 21 critics, indicating "mixed or average reviews". Chitra Ramaswamy, writing for The Guardian, gave the series two stars out of a possible five, criticizing the tonal confusion as "ludicrous at best and at worst disturbing" and summarizing it as "not amusing, just awful".

References

External links
 
 

2022 American television series debuts
2022 American television series endings
2020s American comedy-drama television series
2020s American drama television miniseries
2020s American mystery television series
2020s American satirical television series
Alcohol abuse in television
American thriller television series
English-language Netflix original programming
Television series by Gloria Sanchez Productions
Television shows filmed in Los Angeles
Matricide in fiction
Patricide in fiction
Parodies of horror